Bartlett Laffey (1841 – March 22, 1901) was an Irish-born United States Navy sailor and Medal of Honor recipient.

Biography
Born in County Galway, Ireland, he enlisted in the United States Navy from Massachusetts on March 17, 1862, and was assigned to stern wheel gunboat .

On March 5, 1864, the Confederates launched a heavy attack on Union positions at Yazoo City, Mississippi. In the midst of heated battle Laffey landed a 12-pound howitzer and her crew. Despite enemy rifle fire which cut up the gun carriage and severed the rammer, Laffey bravely stood by his gun and contributed greatly to turning back the fierce Confederate assault. Seaman Laffey received the Medal of Honor for his actions. Two of his shipmates, Seaman James Stoddard and Seaman William J. Franks, were also awarded the medal for being on the gun crew.

He died at Chelsea, Massachusetts, on March 22, 1901.

Namesakes
Two ships in the United States Navy have been given their name in honor of Bartlett Laffey. His granddaughter, Miss Eleanor Fogerty, christened the first , a Benson class destroyer, in 1941. This ship was lost during the Naval Battle of Guadalcanal in 1942. She was laid down less than a year after the loss of the first Laffey and named for that ship as much as for Seaman Laffey. The second USS Laffey is now preserved as a museum ship and is registered as a National Historic Landmark.

Medal of Honor citation
Rank and organization: Seaman, U.S. Navy. Born: 1841, Ireland. Accredited to: Massachusetts. G.O. No.: 32, April 16, 1864.

Citation:

Off Yazoo City, Miss., March 5, 1864, embarking from the Marmora with a 12-pound howitzer mounted on a field carriage, Laffey landed with the gun and crew in the midst of heated battle and, bravely standing by his gun despite enemy rifle fire which cut the gun carriage and rammer, contributed to the turning back of the enemy during the fierce engagement.

See also

List of American Civil War Medal of Honor recipients: G–L

Notes

References

People from County Galway
Irish-born Medal of Honor recipients
1841 births
1901 deaths
19th-century Irish people
Irish emigrants to the United States (before 1923)
Union Navy sailors
United States Navy Medal of Honor recipients
United States Navy sailors
Irish sailors in the United States Navy
American Civil War recipients of the Medal of Honor